Ayatollah Seyed ‘Abd al-Husayn Mousavi Dezfuli Najafi Lari (1226 in SH, Najaf – 1303 in SH, Jahrom), was one of the clergymen and jurists from South Iran who advocated creating a constitution and had a major role during the nomads’ war against British forces in First World War.

Living in Najaf 
Seyed Abdol Hossein Moussavi Najafi Lari was originally from Dezful. He was born in 1847 in Najaf. He completed his studies under the supervision of great scholars such as Mirza Mohammed Hassan Husseini Shirazi, Sheikh Mohammad Hossein Kazemi, and Mullah Lotfollah Mazandarani. At the age of twenty-two he achieved the theological rank (Ijtihad). He lived in Najaf for forty-five years and he was also considered as a professor at Najaf's Seminary."

Migration from Najaf to Lar 
In the late Naser al-Din Shah Qajar era, intense conflicts and insecurity arising from its local rulers and politicians as well as tax abuses. Under the Elders Larestan County area of Mirza Mohammed Hassan Husseini Shirazi, requested they send a Mojtahed to take control of the Muslim community in Larestan County. Therefore, with a view Mirza Mohammed Hassan Husseini Shirazi, in 1309 AH Sayed Abdul Hussain, Najaf left and traveled to Larestan County."

Important measures in Larestan 
His association with the Fars and Bushehr revolutionary forces reflects his important and influential role in the Constitutional Revolution in Fars.

Students 

 Sheikh Abdul Hamid Mohajeri
Sheikh Mohammad also known as Haji Molla Bashi
 Mullah Ghulam reza Jahromi
 Haji Mohammad Hashim Lari
 Mullah Karbalai Mohammad Juyomi
 Syed Abdul Hossein Mehri
 Sheikh Zakaria Ansari
 Syed Abdul al-baghi Shirazi
 Seyed Morteza Mojtahed Ahromi

Death 

Seyed Abdol Hossein lari fourth Friday of Shawwal 1342 AH (19 Ordibehesht 1303 SH) died and was buried after six years of stay in the Jahrom.

References 

19th-century Muslim scholars of Islam
Iranian Shia clerics
People from Jahrom
Iranian jurists
Al-Moussawi family
People of the Persian Constitutional Revolution